Eupithecia huachuca is a moth in the family Geometridae. It is found in Arizona (including the Huachuca Mountains and Chiricahua Mountains) and Texas.

References

Moths described in 1908
huachuca
Moths of North America